The 2015–16 Greek Basket League was the 76th season of the Greek Basket League, the top-tier professional basketball league in Greece.

Teams

Promotion and relegation

Panionios, Panelefsiniakos, and KAOD were relegated after the 2014–15 Greek Basket League. 
Kavala, Arkadikos, and Lavrio were promoted from the A2 League.

Locations and arenas

Personnel and kits

European competitions

Regular season

League table

Results

Playoffs

Bracket

Quarter-finals
In the quarterfinals, teams playing against each other had to win two games to win the series. Thus, if one team wins two games before all three games have been played, the games that remain are omitted. The team that finished in the higher regular season place, played the first and the third (if it was necessary) games of the series at home.

Semi-finals
In the semi-finals, teams playing against each other had to win three games to win the series. Thus, if one team won three games before all five games had been played, the games that remained were omitted. The team that finished in the higher regular season place played the first, the second, and the fifth (if it was necessary) games of the series at home.

Third place
In the series for the third place, teams playing against each other had to win three games to win the 3rd place in the final rankings of the season. Thus, if one team won three games before all five games had been played, the remaining games were omitted. The team that finished in the higher regular season place, played the first, the third, and the fifth (if it was necessary) games of the series at home.

Finals
In the finals, teams playing against each other had to win three games to win the title. Thus, if one team won three games before all five games were played, the remaining games were omitted. The team that finished in the higher regular season place, played the first, the third, and the fifth (if it was necessary) games of the series at home.

Final standings

Statistical leaders
The Greek Basket League counts official stats leaders by stats totals, and not by per game averages. It also counts the total stats for both regular season and playoffs combined.

| width=50% valign=top |

Points

|}
|}
 
| width=50% valign=top |

Assists

|}
|}
{| width=100% 
| width=50% valign=top |

Source widgets.baskethotel.com/site/esake

Season highs

Awards

See also
2015–16 Greek Basketball Cup
2015–16 Greek A2 Basket League (2nd tier)

References

External links 
 Official Basket League Site 
 Official Basket League Site 
 Greek Basket League Official Highlights 
 Official Hellenic Basketball Federation Site 

Greek Basket League seasons
1
Greek